Brachychiton gregorii, commonly known as the desert kurrajong, is a small tree of the genus Brachychiton found in northern and western Australia. It was originally classified in the family Sterculiaceae, which is now within Malvaceae.

Taxonomy
The species was first formally described by the botanist Ferdinand von Mueller in 1862 as part of the work Thalamiflorae. The Plants Indigenous to the Colony of Victoria. Several synonyms exist for the plant including; Clompanus gregorii, Brachychiton acerifolius var. gregorii, Sterculia diversifolia var. occidentalis, Sterculia gregorii and Brachychiton populneus var. occidentalis.
 
The species name honours the explorer Augustus Charles Gregory who later became surveyor-general.

Description
The leaves are shed in the dry months. It flowers between October and December producing inflorescences with bell-shaped pale-yellow flowers with a reddish margin.

Distribution
It has a scattered distribution in arid areas including the north western corner of South Australia where it is found on rock ridges, slopes and sand dunes. It is also found in  the Northern Territory and Western Australia where it is scattered throughout the Goldfields, Pilbara and Mid West regions where it grows in red sandy or loamy soils.

Ecology
The tree is often associated with the region's granite outcrops. The mistletoe Amyema benthamii is often found as a parasite on the species, introduced by a bird wiping its defecation on a branch, and this is eaten by the caterpillar phase of the moth species Comocrus behri.

Uses
The tree is sold commercially in seed form or as a seedling where it is suitable for arid areas. It is drought resistant once established, is moderately frost tolerant, can grow in full sun or part shade in well-drained soils. It forms a large tuber from a young age and can be cultivated as a succulent bonsai.

The wood is spongy, making it suitable for use as wood pulp. The low height and much divided branches produce a dense crown that gives good shade. A strong fibre can be obtained from the cambium layer.

Notes

References

gregorii
Rosids of Western Australia
Flora of South Australia
Flora of the Northern Territory
Malvales of Australia
Trees of Australia
Drought-tolerant trees
Plants described in 1862
Taxa named by Ferdinand von Mueller